Lamberto is an Italian male given name taken from the name Lambert. It may refer to:
Lamberto Alvarez, Artist - Contemporary
Lamberto Antonio, Philippine writer
Lamberto V. Avellana (1915–1991), prominent Filipino film and stage director
Lamberto Bava (born 1944), Italian film director, specializing in horror and fantasy films
Lamberto Bergamini (1885–1957), Italian tenor from Pisa
Lamberto Cesari (1910–1990), Italian mathematician naturalized in the United States
Lamberto da Cingoli, inquisitor in 14th century Italy
Lamberto Dalla Costa (1920–1982), Italian bobsledder who competed in the late 1950s
Lamberto Dini (help·info) (born 1931), Italian politician and economist
Lamberto Gama (born 1992), football player
Lamberto Gardelli (1915–1998), Italian conductor, especially of the works of Giuseppe Verdi
Lamberto Grimaldi (1420–1494), Lord of Monaco from 1458
Lamberto I da Polenta (died 1316), Lord of Ravenna from 1297 until his death
Lamberto II da Polenta (died 1347), shortly Lord of Ravenna and Cervia from 1346 until his death
Lamberto Leonardi (born 1939), Italian professional football coach and a former player
Lamberto Leoni (born 1953), former racing driver from Italy
Lamberto Maggiorani (1909–1983), Italian actor, portrayed Antonio Ricci in Ladri di Biciclette
Lamberto Picasso (1880–1962), Italian film actor
Lamberto Pignotti (born 1926), Italian poet, writer and visual artist
Lamberto Puggelli (1938–2013), Italian stage and opera director
Antonio Lamberto Rusconi, J.U.D. (1743–1825), Italian cardinal who served as bishop of Imola
Lamberto Sposini (born 1952), Italian journalist, news speaker and television presenter
Lamberto Visconti di Eldizio (died 1225), the Judge of Gallura from 1206
Lamberto Zannier (born 1954), Italian diplomat and United Nations Special Representative for Kosovo
Lamberto Zauli (born 1971), Italian association football coach and former player

See also
Cardinal Lamberto, fictional character appearing in The Godfather Part III
Mario Lamberto (born 1957), Italian conductor

Italian masculine given names